Curtimorda maculosa is a species of beetle in the genus Curtimorda. It was described by Neazen in 1794.

References

Mordellidae
Beetles described in 1794